Yu Hung-chun (4 January 1898 – 1 June 1960), also known as O. K. Yui, was a Chinese political figure who served as mayor of Shanghai, chairman of the Taiwan Provincial Government and  Premier of the Republic of China.

Right before the Battle of Shanghai, he tried to negotiate with the Japanese unsuccessfully.

Chronology
 23 March 1937 – the Executive Yuan resolved that Yu Hung-chun may act as mayor of Shanghai.
 27 July 1937 – the Nationalist Government appointed Yu Hung-chun as mayor of Shanghai.
 30 June 1958 – resigned as the president of the Executive Yuan.(Premier of the Republic of China)

References

1898 births
1960 deaths
People from Xinhui District
Premiers of the Republic of China on Taiwan
Republic of China politicians from Guangdong
Finance Ministers of the Republic of China
Mayors of Shanghai
Taiwanese people from Guangdong
St. John's University, Shanghai alumni
Governors of the Central Bank of the Republic of China
Politicians from Jiangmen